Tumor necrosis factor, alpha-induced protein 3 or A20 is a protein that in humans is encoded by the TNFAIP3 gene.

This gene was identified as a gene whose expression is rapidly induced by the tumor necrosis factor (TNF). The protein encoded by this gene is a zinc finger protein and a deubiquitinating enzyme, and has been shown to inhibit NF-kappa B activation as well as TNF-mediated apoptosis. The A20 protein is ancient, and protein homolog can be found as far back as cnidaria (corals, jellyfish, anemones) with a conserved protein domain composition. Using knockout mouse models of TNFAIP3 and its transcriptional repressor (i.e. KCHIP3), TNFAIP3 has been shown to be critical for limiting inflammation by terminating endotoxin- and TNF-induced NF-kappa B responses. In brief, deubiquitinase function of TNFAIP3 was shown to remove ubiquitin chains from VE-cadherin to prevent loss of VE-cadherin at the endothelial adherens junctions.

Interactions
TNFAIP3 has been shown to interact with TNIP1, TRAF1, TRAF2, IKBKG, TAX1BP1, YWHAB, YWHAZ, TRAF6 and YWHAH.

Association with rheumatoid arthritis
The TNFAIP3 locus is implicated as a positively associated factor in rheumatoid arthritis (RA). The rs5029937 (T) and the rs6920220 (A) SNPs increase risk of RA by 20 to 40% respectively. A third SNP, rs10499194 (T) is found less often in rheumatoid arthritis but this negative association may not be statistically meaningful.

Other diseases

An association with infantile onset intractable inflammatory bowel disease has also been reported.

See also
 Haploinsufficiency of A20

References

Further reading

External links